Jalandhar district is a district in Doaba region of the state of Punjab, India. The district headquarters is the city of Jalandhar.

Before the Partition of India, Jalandhar was also the headquarters of the Jalandhar Division, with constituent districts Jalandhar, Hoshiarpur, Ludhiana, Ferozepur and Kangra. The entire Jalandhar Division was awarded to India when Punjab was partitioned.

History

Classical
Jalandhar was the site of the Katoch Rajput kingdom of Jalandhara, also known as Trigartta. The date of its founding is unclear, but its presence is observed by the Chinese pilgrim Xuanzang in the seventh century, and Kalhana records the defeat of Prithvi Chandra Raja of Trigartta by Sankara Varmma of Kashmir towards the end of the ninth century.

Medieval
Jalandhar became part of the Persianate Ghaznavid Empire during the reign of Ibrahim Shah sometime between 1058 and 1098, and by 1240, it was a fief of the Delhi Sultanate. In 1298, an army led by Ulugh Khan and Zafar Khan defeated in battle, and forced the retreat of invading Mongols of the Chagatai Khanate.

The sack and plunder of Delhi by Timur in 1398 gravely weakened the Delhi Sultanate and ushered in a period of lawlessness in the country. In 1416, the governor of Jalandhar, Malik Tughan assassinated the governor of Sirhind, and later rebelled against Khizr Khan, before being defeated.  In the following years Jasrath Khokhar led a series of raids across Jalandhar as he challenged the authority of the Sultan.  In 1441, Jalandhar came under the authority of Bahlol Lodi who was appointed governor of Lahore province. Lodi made peace with Jasrath, rebelled and in 1450 became sovereign of Delhi.

Early modern

Mughal
When Babur invaded northern India in 1524 he granted the jagir of Jalandhar to Daulat Khan Lodi at whose instigation he had come.  The following year Lodi revolted and was defeated by Babur. In 1540, Babur's son Humayun was expelled by Sher Shah Suri and Jalandhar became part of the Sur Empire. On Humayun's return in 1555, Jalandhar was occupied by his general Bairam Khan and later Akbar. Whilst Akbar had moved east to fight Hemu, Sikandar Suri defeated Khizr Khan, governor of Lahore, at Chamiari in the north of the district.  On Akbar's return to Jalandhar, Mughal hegemony was re-established.

During Akbar's reign, the city of Jalandhar became one of his mint cities. In 1594, the town of Kartarpur was founded by Guru Arjan on land granted by Akbar. The reigns of Jahangir and Shah Jahan saw significant improvements to the region's infrastructure, and many villages were founded.  The town of Phillaur dates from this period, when it was selected for one of the serais on the Delhi to Lahore road, whilst the town of Nurmahal was re-established by Jahangir's consort Nur Jahan, who is believed to have been raised there.  Mughal administrative authority in Jalandhar lasted into the reign of Muhammad Shah, evidenced by the significant number of land grants in the district issued by the Emperor.

Durrani
Nader Shah's invasion of India, culminating in the sack of Delhi in 1739, effectively ended Mughal imperial power. During his fourth invasion, Nurmahal was plundered and its inhabitants slaughtered.  In 1756, Adina Beg, a native of Jalandhar, assisted militarily by Jassa Singh Ramgarhia, defeated Sarbuland Khan, the Afghan general and captured Jalandhar. In 1758, the Mahrattas, at the instigation of Adina Beg, invaded the Punjab, defeating the Afghans, and installing Adina Beg as governor of the entire province.   Adina Beg died in 1759, and in 1761 the Afghans returned, taking control of the Punjab, and driving out the Mahrattas.

Sikh
The death of Adina Beg coincided with the start of increasing Sikh influence in Jalandhar, with many sardars dating the acquisition of their estates from 1759. The Dallewalia Misl, one of twelve Sikh Misls that came to dominate the Punjab during this period originated in the southern extremities of the district. In 1766 the Faizullapuria Misl of Khushal Singh captured the town of Jalandhar and thereafter entrenched their power in the district.

In 1811, Ranjit Singh despatched Dewan Mokham Chand to annex Faizullapuria dominions in Jalandhar. By August that year, Budh Singh, son of Khushal Singh, had fled and Jalandhar came under the control of Lahore and part of the Sikh Empire. The petty sardars of the district were gradually ousted from their estates, and were replaced by the direct management of the Sikh governors.

Modern

British
During both the First Anglo-Sikh War  and Second Anglo-Sikh War no significant battle took place in Jalandhar. Following the British victory in 1846, Jalandhar was ceded to the East India Company becoming part of the Trans Sutlej States.

When the Indian Rebellion of 1857 began, Jalandhar was strategically important as a main line of communication between the Punjab and Delhi.  Incidents of mutiny originated in Jalandhar and Phillaur cantonments, however they were suppressed by the 8th Foot who in turn were strengthened by troops provided by Randhir Singh of Kapurthala, John Nicholson’s moveable column and the Tiwana horse under Sher Muhammad Khan.

In 1858, Jalandhar became part of the British Raj and in 1863 became administratively part of Punjab province.

The first case of the plague in the Punjab was reported in the village of Khatkar Kalan in 1897.

Partition
In early 1947, communal tensions heightened in Jalandhar and across the Punjab. In March riots occurred in the district following speeches made by Congress and Sikh leaders at Lahore. In June 1947, the Indian Independence Act 1947 stipulated the partition of the Punjab, and on 17 August the Radcliffe Line was announced, placing Jalandhar in the new Dominion of India. As Jalandhar had a Muslim majority at the time it led to significant demographic change in the district, with the Muslim population becoming refugees in Pakistan, and an influx of Hindus and Sikhs arriving having abandoned their homes in the new Pakistan.

Administration
The district is divided into five tehsils:

Jalandhar-I, Jalandhar-II, Nakodar, Phillaur, and Shahkot

In addition there are a further five sub-tehsils:

Adampur, Bhogpur, Goraya, Kartarpur, and Nurmahal

Constituencies
Jalandhar Lok Sabha constituency is one of the 13 Lok Sabha constituencies in Punjab.

There are also nine Punjab Vidhan Sabha constituencies located in the district:

Adampur, Jalandhar Cantt, Jalandhar Central, Jalandhar North, Jalandhar West, Kartarpur, Nakodar, Phillaur, and Shahkot

MLA

Demographics

According to the 2011 census Jalandhar district has a population of 4,193,590, roughly equal to the nation of Latvia or the US state of New Mexico. This gives it a ranking of 208th in India (out of a total of 640). Its population growth rate over the decade 2001-2011 was  11.16%. Jalandhar has a sex ratio of  913 females for every 1000 males, and a literacy rate of 91.4%. Scheduled Castes made up 38.95% of the population.

Religion 

Hinduism is the majority religion. In rural areas, Sikhs and Hindus are roughly equal proportions, but in urban areas, Hindus are predominant.

Language 

At the time of the 2011 census, 88.15% of the population spoke Punjabi and 9.83% Hindi as their first language. Hindi is predominantly spoken in urban areas.

References 
 

https://jalandhar.nic.in/list-of-deputy-commissioner/

External links 

 

 
Districts of Punjab, India